Lever & Kitchen was a major manufacturer, now part of Unilever.

Lever & Kitchen may also refer to:

Lever Brothers, British manufacturing company
Lever Brothers Factory, Balmain, New South Wales, Australia
W. H. Burford & Sons, Australian business that merged with Lever & Kitchen